The IIHF World Women's Challenge was a women's IIHF-sanctioned tournament held for the 2002 season only. It featured national teams, and there were Division I and Division II competitions.

Division I was held in Tilburg, Netherlands from February 8–10, Division II was held from March 8–10 in Kingston, England.

Tournament

Division I

Division II

References
 IIHF World Women’s Challenge on hockeyarchives.info

Chall
Women
World
2002
International Ice Hockey Federation tournaments
2002